Coughran is an unincorporated community in Atascosa County, in the U.S. state of Texas. According to the Handbook of Texas, the community had a population of 20 in 2000. It is located within the San Antonio metropolitan area.

History
Coughran was named for W.A. Coughran, who established the community in 1912 and built a store, a bank, a gin, and a post office and artesian wells the next year to attract settlers to the area. The San Antonio, Uvalde, and Gulf Railroad built a track through the community in 1913. Coughran had a population of 100 in 1914 and had a local newspaper called the Coughran Observer, as well as a hotel and several businesses for retail and manufacturing. The community sold cotton and watermelons and lost half of its population during the 1920s. It lost half of its population again in the mid-1930s but grew back to 50 from the 1940s through 1964. The community was owned by the Eichelberger family in 1986 and operated a store called Big Oak Antiques. Its population was 20 in 2000.

Geography

Education
A school was built by W.A. Coughran in 1913. This school had 66 students that year. A new school was built in 1924 and was expanded in 1933 to hold 134 students. It joined the Pleasanton Independent School District in 1956. It continues to be served by Pleasanton ISD to this day.

References

Unincorporated communities in Atascosa County, Texas
Unincorporated communities in Texas